Lithuanian partisans were partisans who waged a guerrilla warfare in Lithuania against the Soviet Union in 1944–1953.

Lithuanian partisans may also refer to various irregular military units in different historical periods active in Lithuania against foreign invaders and occupiers:

 Lithuanian guerrilla troops during the Lithuanian–Soviet War
 Lithuanian irregular military troops during the Polish–Lithuanian War
 Lithuanian partisans (1941), a collective name of several unrelated groups
 Irregular military units formed by Lithuanian Jews during World War II; see 
 Soviet partisans acting in Eastrn Lithuania during World War II

See also 
Belarusian partisans
Forest Brothers (organized anti-Soviet resistance in the Baltic states)
Jewish partisans
Latvian partisans
Polish partisans (disambiguation)
Soviet partisans